Lesli Margherita is an American stage and screen actress. She is best known for originating the roles of Inez in the musical Zorro, for which she won a Laurence Olivier Award, and Mrs. Wormwood in the Broadway cast of Matilda the Musical.

Early life and education
Margherita graduated from the University of California, Los Angeles.

Career

Film and television
Margherita's film credits include Boogeyman 2, Lucky Stiff, Cinderella III: A Twist in Time, and Opening Night.
 
Upon graduation she appeared in the TV show Fame L.A.. Her television credits include NYPD Blue, Charmed, The District, On the Lot, The Suite Life on Deck, Major Crimes and Donny!.

Theatre
Margherita became involved with the musical Zorro through a workshop in 2006, which she initially turned down, in Los Angeles, California. She remained with the production through to the West End premiere in June 2008, and garnered critical acclaim for her performance as Inez. In 2009, she won the Laurence Olivier Award for Best Performance in a Supporting Role in a Musical and received a WhatsOnStage Award nomination. Margherita performed a number from the show at the 2008 Royal Variety Performance, and can be heard on the original London cast recording. In 2020, she reprised her performance for a one-night concert version in London.

She appeared as Mrs. Wormwood in the Broadway production of Matilda the Musical, from March 2013 to September 2015 and again starting in September 2016.

She played the role of Mona Kent in the Broadway premiere of Dames at Sea which opened in October 2015. The USA Today review noted, "the actress plays the tyrannical vamp with infectious relish."

She appeared as Cindy Lou Who in the Off-Broadway one person Who's Holiday! in November and December 2017. She was nominated for the 2018 Drama Desk Award, Outstanding Solo Performance; 2018 Lucille Lortel Award, Outstanding Solo Show; and 2018 Off Broadway Alliance Award, Best Solo Performance.

In regional theatre, Margherita appeared in Spamalot at the Sacramento Music Circus as The Lady of the Lake in 2010. She appeared as Audrey in Little Shop of Horrors at La Mirada Theatre in La Mirada, California, from April to May 2011. From July to September 2011, she appeared at the Goodspeed Opera House in East Haddam, Connecticut, in Show Boat as Julie. She appeared in the new musical The Flamingo Kid at the Hartford Stage in Connecticut from May to June 2019. The Variety reviewer wrote, "Also standing out is Lesli Margherita as Phyllis, Phil’s long-suffering snob of a wife, who gets every laugh effortlessly with her deadpan delivery. She also nails her second act number, a good song with a terrible title".

From January 19, 2020, to March 11, 2020, Lesli starred as Princess in the musical Emojiland at the Duke on 42nd Street theater in New York City.

Concerts
Margherita performed her concert/cabaret act at The Green Room 42 in New York City in December 2018.

Filmography

Film

Television

Awards and nominations

References

External links
 
 
 
 

Place of birth missing (living people)
Living people
American film actresses
American television actresses
American musical theatre actresses
1973 births
21st-century American women